Alice Meichi Li (李美姿) is a Chinese-American, New York City-based visual artist and illustrator for comic books, magazines, and album covers.

Early life

Li was born to immigrants of Chinese descent, and was raised in Detroit, Michigan.

She went on to major in Cartooning at School of Visual Arts in New York City, later switching to Illustration.  While at SVA, she became the only Illustration student in her year to receive the Alumni Scholarship Award.

Bibliography

Covers

 Mega Man #21 (2013, Variant Cover) Archie Comics
 Elephantmen #36 (2011, Back Cover) Image Comics

Sequentials

 Reading With Pictures: Comics That Make Kids Smarter (2014, Hardcover) Andrews McMeel Publishing
 Secret Identities Volume 2: Shattered (2012, TPB) The New Press
 Reading With Pictures (2010, TPB) (Harvey Award-nominated)

Interior illustrations

 Hana Doki Kira (2014, TPB) The Year 85 Group
 Long Hidden: Speculative Fiction from the Margins of History (2014, Softcover) Crossed Genres Publications
 Once Upon a Time Machine (2012, TPB) Dark Horse Comics (Harvey Award-nominated)
 GirlsDrawinGirls Volume 4: The Way Nature Made Her (2011, Hardcover)

Magazines

 YRB Magazine (2011)
 CMYK Magazine (2009)

Exhibitions

Group

 Alt.Comics: Asian American Artists Reinvent the Comic Book (2012) Museum of Chinese in America, New York, NY 
 NeoIntegrity: Comics Edition (2010) Museum of Comic and Cartoon Art, New York, NY
 Tripnotica NYC (2007) Galapagos Art Space, Brooklyn, NY

Juried

 Gamescape (2011) Artscape, Baltimore, MD

Recognition

 Society of Illustrators of Los Angeles: 2008, 2013 (Silver Award)
 Harvey Awards: 2011 (Nominated, Best Anthology & Best Original Graphic Publication for Younger Readers), 2013 (Nominated, Best Anthology)
 Applied Arts Illustration Awards: 2009 (Editorial Category)
 American Illustration: 2007 (Chosen)
 Worldstudio AIGA: 2002 (W.K. Kellogg Foundation Award)
 The Scholastic Art & Writing Awards: 2002 (Two Silver Keys)

References

External links 

 
 
 "Music, Genetics and Fantasy: An Alice Meichi Li Gallery". io9 (2010-03-04), by Ann VanderMeer

Year of birth missing (living people)
20th-century births
Living people
School of Visual Arts alumni
American women illustrators
American illustrators
American female comics artists
Chinese illustrators
Chinese comics artists
Chinese female comics artists
American people of Chinese descent
Artists from Detroit
21st-century American women